Eldon Danenhauer (October 4, 1935 – June 23, 2021) was an American football offensive tackle. He played college football at the Pittsburg State University in Pittsburg, Kansas, and professionally in the American Football League (NFL) with the Denver Broncos from 1960 through 1965. He was an AFL All-Star in 1962 and 1965.

He died on June 23, 2021, in Topeka, Kansas, at age 85.

See also
 List of American Football League players

References

1935 births
2021 deaths
American football offensive tackles
Denver Broncos (AFL) players
Emporia State Hornets football players
Pittsburg State Gorillas football players
American Football League All-Star players
People from Clay Center, Kansas
Players of American football from Kansas